Naomi Broady and Asia Muhammad were the defending champions, but Muhammad chose not to participate. Broady partnered alongside Ayaka Okuno but lost in the first round to Emina Bektas and Tara Moore.

Hiroko Kuwata and Ena Shibahara won the title, defeating Erina Hayashi and Moyuka Uchijima in the final, 0–6, 6–4, [10–5].

Seeds

Draw

Draw

References
Main Draw

Kurume U.S.E Cup - Doubles
Kurume Best Amenity Cup